Visifire was a set of data visualization components. It currently supports Charts and Gauges. Visifire is available on Microsoft Silverlight, WPF, Windows Phone, and Windows 8. One can use the same API to create charts and gauges in mobile, web, and desktop environments. Visifire can also be embedded in any webpage as a standalone Silverlight App. It is independent of the server side technology being used. Hence, Visifire can be used with ASP, ASP.NET, PHP, JSP, ColdFusion, Ruby on Rails or just simple HTML with JavaScript.

History
Visifire development was started during the early release of Silverlight 1.1 Alpha by Microsoft. As the next release of Silverlight was directly Silverlight 2.0 beta, it was ported to Silverlight 2.0 beta. Release of Silverlight 2.0 Final, opened up slew of possibilities. To exploit the full power of Silverlight 2.0, major architectural changes were done & all new Visifire 2.0 was released. Later came Visifire 3.0 with improved looks & major performance improvements. Gauges were introduced with Visifire 4.0.  Later Visifire for SharePoint was introduced, a wizard driven solution to create stunning SharePoint charts. Next major update from Visifire is the support for Windows Phone and Windows 8 applications. Recently released version is Visifire 5.0  with major performance improvements.

Current version
Current version of Visifire is 5.1.5

Features
 Visually appealing animated charts
 It can be embedded into any Web, Desktop or Mobile Applications
 Supports wide range of Charts & Gauges
 Real Time Charts / Live Update
 High Performance Charts
 Supports Interactivity
 Supports Scrolling and Zooming
 Online chart designer to help creating charts
 Editable on Microsoft Expression Blend
 Windows Phone 7 & Windows Phone 8 support
 Windows 8 support
 SharePoint charts
 Enterprise grade features

Technical specification
 Developed using C# and XAML
 JavaScript API to embed in web pages

Platforms
Visifire runs on various platforms: Silverlight, WPF, Windows Phone and Windows 8.

License
Visifire is licensed commercially - one can buy a royalty free license based on number of developers. It was once distributed under GPL but was discontinued due to the confusion prevailing around Windows Phone Marketplace.

Support
Priority Support is provided to Enterprise Customers through ticket system. All users are supported through Visifire Community Forum.

External links
 Official Webyog home page
  Scottgu's Blog
 Pete Brown's Blog

References

Microsoft Silverlight
Windows Phone
Windows 8
SharePoint